Peter S. Onuf is an American historian and professor known for his work on U.S. President Thomas Jefferson and Federalism. In 1989, he was named the Thomas Jefferson Memorial Foundation Professor of the University of Virginia, a chair he held until retiring in 2012. 
The chair's previous occupants included Jefferson biographers Dumas Malone and Merrill D. Peterson; he was succeeded by Alan Taylor.

Life
A native New Englander, Onuf graduated from Johns Hopkins University, where he worked with eminent early American historian Jack P. Greene. He taught at Columbia University, Worcester Polytechnic Institute, and Southern Methodist University. In 2008, he held the Harold Vyvyan Harmsworth Professor of American History chair at the University of Oxford.

Onuf also acted as a cohost for the radio show  BackStory with the American History Guys. In 2014, he taught a free online U-Va. course on Thomas Jefferson.

Publications
(with Annette Gordon-Reed) "Most Blessed of the Patriarchs": Thomas Jefferson and the Empire of the Imagination, Liveright, 2016. 
The Mind of Thomas Jefferson. Charlottesville: University of Virginia Press, 2007. 
(with Nicholas G. Onuf). Nations, Markets, and War: Modern History and the American Civil War, Charlottesville: University of Virginia Press, 2006. 
ed. (with James Horn and Jan Ellen Lewis). The Revolution of 1800: Democracy, Race, and the New Republic. Charlottesville: University of Virginia Press, 2002. 
Jefferson's Empire: The Language of American Nationhood. Charlottesville: University Press of Virginia, 2001. 
(with Leonard Sadosky) Jeffersonian America. Oxford: Basil Blackwell's, 2001. 
ed. (with Jan Ellen Lewis). Sally Hemings and Thomas Jefferson: History, Memory, and Civic Culture. University Press of Virginia, 1999. 
(with Edward L. Ayers, Patricia N. Limerick, and Stephen Nissenbaum). All Over the Map: Rethinking Region and Nation in the United States. Johns Hopkins University Press, 1996.
ed. Jeffersonian Legacies. University Press of Virginia, 1993. 
(with Nicholas G. Onuf), Federal Union, Modern World: The Law of Nations in an Age of Revolution, 1776–1814. Madison House, 1993.
 Patriots, redcoats, and loyalists New York : Garland, 1991. 
(with Cathy D. Matson), A Union of Interests: Politics and Economics in Revolutionary America, University Press of Kansas. 1990.
(with Andrew R. L. Cayton), The Midwest and the Nation. Indiana University Press, 1990.
Statehood and Union: A History of the Northwest Ordinance. Indiana University Press, 1987.
Origins of the Federal Republic: Jurisdictional Controversies in the United States, 1775–1787. University of Pennsylvania Press, 1983.

References

External links

Living people
Johns Hopkins University alumni
University of Virginia faculty
20th-century American historians
21st-century American historians
Historians of the United States
Year of birth missing (living people)
American male non-fiction writers
20th-century American male writers
21st-century American male writers